Craig Howard Lincoln (born October 7, 1950 in Minneapolis, Minnesota) is an American former diver who competed in the 1972 Summer Olympics, where he won the bronze medal.

References

1950 births
Living people
Divers at the 1972 Summer Olympics
Olympic bronze medalists for the United States in diving
American male divers
Sportspeople from Minneapolis
Medalists at the 1972 Summer Olympics
1972 in sports in Minnesota
Pan American Games medalists in diving
Pan American Games silver medalists for the United States
Divers at the 1971 Pan American Games
Medalists at the 1971 Pan American Games